Yuk Young-soo (29 November 1925 – 15 August 1974) was the wife of the 3rd South Korean president Park Chung-hee and the mother of the 11th South Korean president Park Geun-hye. She was killed in 1974 during an attempted assassination of her husband, Park Chung-hee.

Early life
Yuk was born in Okcheon County, North Chungcheong Province, Korea in 1925, the second of three daughters of a prosperous self-made landlord. She graduated from Baehwa High School for Girls (presently known as Paihwa Girls' High School). In August 1950 she met Park Chung-hee through a relative who was serving under Park. On 12 December 1950 she married Park Chung-hee. While her mother supported her choice of husband, Yuk's father was against the match, so she married without his blessing.

First Lady

When Park Chung-hee was in the mission as the chairman of the Supreme Council for National Reconstruction, Yuk Young-soo's main interest was handling civil complaints. Jeong Jae-hoon, a disciple and secretary of the First Lady's Office for six years, recalled: 

“We have conversations with as many people as possible to collect public opinion on the streets, and dozens of complaints a day are left with instructions. I made them run.”

 
Yuk Young-soo always made a simple impression on people regarding Hanbok and elegance, and was a sincere wife to her husband at home. She also took great interest in children and health, and often visited orphanages and nurseries several times to develop policies for children's health. During her husband's tenure, she mainly took care of receiving guests and dealing with complaints, although she wanted to do her part as “a revolutionary's wife”. She was also involved with the Red Cross and with children with autism. In 1970, the construction of Children's Grand Park started and opened the following year. 

She was also close to the people, and visited patients suffering from leprosy. She helped to start several self-support projects, and visited the families of South Korean soldiers deployed to Vietnam, to comfort and console them. In 1973, she undertook projects which saw the development of vocational training institutes for poor and disadvantaged youth. Because of the efforts of Yuk Young-soo, a vigorous social services are professional because the social welfare-oriented vocational training that have had to know glim of poverty. 

She also did not hesitate to try to influence her husband, especially in 1963, when, to resolve tensions with the American ambassador Samuel D. Berger, she invited him to the Blue House. Park Chung-hee then joked about it, going so far as to consider her "the first opposition party". In 1969, she created a private foundation with the aim of improving the well-being of South Korean children. In 1974, a mother was invited to the Blue House revealed that her child was suffering from facial paralysis. Yuk Young-soo found the best acupuncture center and hospitalized him.

Assassination
At 10:23 a.m., 15 August 1974, South Korean Independence Day, Yuk was shot and killed by Mun Se-gwang, a Zainichi Korean and North Korean sympathizer, during an attempt by Mun to assassinate President Park Chung-hee.

The assassination occurred at the Seoul National Theater of Korea during an Independence Day ceremony. Mun intended to shoot Park in the theater lobby. However, his view was obstructed, and he was forced to enter and be seated near the back of the theater. During Park's address, he attempted to get closer to the President but inadvertently fired his Smith & Wesson Model 36 revolver prematurely, injuring himself. Having alerted security, he then ran down the theater aisle firing wildly. His second bullet hit the left side of the podium from which Park was delivering his speech. The third bullet was a misfire. His fourth bullet struck Yuk Young-soo in the head, seriously wounding her. His last bullet went through a flag decorating the rear of the stage. A bullet fired by Park Jong-gyu, a member of the President's security detail, in response to Mun's attack, ricocheted off a wall and killed a high school student, Jang Bong-hwa. Immediately following the capture of Mun, Park resumed his scheduled speech despite the wounding of his wife and her being carried from the stage. Following its completion he picked up his wife's handbag and shoes and left.

Yuk was rushed to the Seoul National University Hospital in Wonnam-dong, central Seoul. Dr. Shim Bo-seong, who was chief of the hospital's neurosurgery department, began operating on Yuk at 11 a.m., which lasted for over five hours. The bullet damaged the largest vein on the right side of her brain and remained lodged within the brain. The surgery was unable to save her life and she died at 7:00 p.m. that same day.

Aftermath 

Yuk was buried in a state funeral on 19 August 1974. Yuk Young-soo is buried next to her husband at the Seoul National Cemetery. Park composed the following poem the day after Yuk's state funeral.

Like a Long Magnolia Blossom Bending to the Wind
Under heavy silence
Of a house in mourning
Only the cry of cicadas
Maam, maam, maam
Seem to long for you who is now gone
Under the August sun
The Indian Lilacs turn crimson
As if trying to heal the wounds of the mind
My wife has departed alone
Only I am left
Like a lone magnolia blossom bending to the wind
Where can I appeal
The sadness of a broken heart

Park Geun-hye then became the First Lady of South Korea, after returning urgently from her studies in France at the Joseph Fourier University. She held this position for five years, until her father's assassination in 1979. Yuk Young-soo remains in the eyes of the South Korean people as the most appreciated First Lady, returning a calm image of wise and temperate woman. On her 42nd death anniversary, a concert was organized on memory of her in Seoul.

Honours
:
 Honorary Recipient of the Grand Order of Mugunghwa (1967)
:
 Honorary Recipient of the Most Exalted Order of the Crown of the Realm (1965)

Personal life

Yuk Young-soo and  Park Chung-hee had three children: daughters Park Geun-hye, the 11th president of South Korea, as well as Park Geun-ryoung and a son Park Ji-man.

Yuk Young-soo was a devout Buddhist and a devotee of Doseonsa in Seoul.

See also
Assassination of Park Chung-hee

References

Bibliography

External links

1925 births
1974 deaths
Assassinated South Korean people
Deaths by firearm in South Korea
First Ladies of South Korea
People from North Chungcheong Province
People murdered in South Korea
South Korean Buddhists
Filmed assassinations
Park family
Yuk clan
Burials at Seoul National Cemetery